Leptosiphon lemmonii (syn. Linanthus lemmonii) is a species of flowering plant in the phlox family known by the common name Lemmon's linanthus.

Leptosiphon lemmonii is native to the San Bernardino Mountains and the Peninsular Ranges in southern California (U.S.) and northern Baja California (México). It grows below , in dry inland chaparral, oak woodlands, the Colorado Desert chaparral ecotone, and Yellow pine forest habitats.

Description
Leptosiphon lemmonii is a small, hairy, glandular annual herb producing a thin stem no more than about 15 centimeters tall. The leaves are divided into needle-like linear lobes, each a few millimeters in length.

The inflorescence is an array of a few small flowers accompanied by bracts shaped much like the leaves. Each flower has lobes only 2 or 3 millimeters long, usually white or cream in color darkening to yellow and orange in the throat, sometimes with maroon areas as well. The bloom period is April to June.

References

External links
Calflora Database: Leptosiphon lemmonii (Lemmon's linanthus)
Jepson Manual eFlora (TJM2) treatment of Leptosiphon lemmonii
UC CalPhotos gallery — Leptosiphon lemmonii

lemmonii
Flora of California
Flora of Baja California
Flora of the California desert regions
Flora of the Sonoran Deserts
Natural history of the California chaparral and woodlands
Natural history of the Peninsular Ranges
Natural history of the Colorado Desert
~
Flora without expected TNC conservation status